Sleep together may refer to:

Sexual intercourse
"Sleep Together", a song by Garbage from Version 2.0, 1998
"Sleep Together", a song by Porcupine Tree from Fear of a Blank Planet, 2007